= CSwiss =

Austrian beverage producer

CSWISS
- Company type: Private
- Industry: Beverage
- Founded: 1999; 27 years ago
- Area served: Worldwide
- Website: www.cswiss.com

CSwiss or C+Swiss is the producer of CSwiss Iced Tea, a hemp based iced tea. The company was founded in 1999 and based in Austria.

== History ==
CSwiss was founded in 1999 in Austria. Product production began in 2003 after Seagull Trading GmbH took over international sales.

In 2004 the company shipped ice tea to the United States and by 2007 CSwiss was listed by MERKUR and distributed to over 500 stores worldwide.

== Product ==
C+Swiss is a hemp based icea tea which is legal in the United States. C+Swiss contains 0.0015% THC and is environmentally friendly.

In 2013, MediSwipe Inc, a data management solutions company for the medicinal marijuana and health care industry, signed an agreement for "Chillo" hemp based energy drink and C+Swiss ice teas. The agreement expands C+Swiss to cover all of Oregon which included 200 stores and is expected to reach 5,000 units weekly.
